Großhansdorf is the terminus station on the Großhansdorf branch of Hamburg U-Bahn line U1. The rapid transit station was opened in 1921 and is located in the Hamburg suburb of Großhansdorf, Germany. Großhansdorf is a municipality in the German state of Schleswig-Holstein.

History 
At the time the station was opened, Großhansdorf was an exclave of the Free and Hanseatic City of Hamburg. With the Greater Hamburg Act of 1937, Großhansdorf was ceased to Schleswig-Holstein and it was temporarily consider to close the station. Since 2007 the station is handicap-accessible.

Layout 
The station's building and only entrance is located at a street junction in the town's center. The single island platform and the two side tracks run along one of these two streets.

Service

Trains 
Großhansdorf is served by Hamburg U-Bahn line U1; departures are every 20 minutes, during rush hour every 10 minutes. The travel time to Hamburg Hauptbahnhof takes about 40 minutes.

Gallery

See also 

 List of Hamburg U-Bahn stations

References

External links 

 Line and route network plans by hvv.de 
 100 Jahre Hochbahn by hochbahn.de 

Hamburg U-Bahn stations in Schleswig-Holstein
Transport infrastructure completed in 1914
U1 (Hamburg U-Bahn) stations
Buildings and structures in Stormarn (district)
Railway stations in Germany opened in 1921